Annesa M. Flentje is an American clinical psychologist specializing in reducing health disparities in LGBT community. She is an assistant professor at the UCSF School of Nursing.

Education 
Flentje completed a B.A. at University of Montana (UM) in 2000. She earned a M.S. at Capella University in 2003.

Flentje completed a M.A. in clinical psychology at UM in 2006. Her graduate thesis was titled, Effects of Different Types of Drinking and Driving PSAs on Persons with Varying Levels of Drinking and Driving Experience.

In 2012, Flentje earned a Ph.D. in clinical psychology at UM. She completed a postdoctoral fellowship in drug abuse treatment services research at the University of California, San Francisco.

Career and research 
Flentje is an associate professor at the UCSF School of Nursing. She is a clinical psychologist who focuses on reducing  health disparities in the LGBT community.

Her research has targeted multiple ways to reduce these disparities, including prevention, increasing the visibility of sexual and gender minorities in research, and improving mental health and substance abuse services for sexual and gender minorities. Her current research is identifying the relationship between minority stress, substance use, and biological functioning at the molecular level (i.e., gene expression and DNA methylation). She has developed an individually delivered intervention to reduce minority stress among sexual minority men and is investigating it as a means to reduce substance use and improve the physical and mental health of sexual minority people.

Flentje is an associate director of The PRIDE Study, a prospective, national, longitudinal study of the health of sexual and gender minority individuals within the United States that has enrolled more than 12,000 sexual and gender minority people to date.

Awards and honors 
Flentje was an early-stage investigator awardee at the 2018 National Institutes of Health Sexual and Gender Minority Research Investigator Awards Program.

References

External links
 

Living people
Year of birth missing (living people)
Place of birth missing (living people)
University of Montana alumni
University of California, San Francisco faculty
American women psychologists
21st-century American psychologists
21st-century American women scientists
Capella University alumni
American clinical psychologists